Din Mehmeti (1932 – 12 November 2010) was an Albanian poet from Kosovo. He was among the best-known classical representatives of contemporary verse in Kosovo.

Career
He was born in 1932 in the village of Gjocaj, Junik, near Gjakova, Kosovo. He studied Albanian language and literature at the University of Belgrade. He later lectured at the teacher training college in Gjakova. Although he has published some prose, literary criticism and a play, he is known primarily for his figurative poetry which has appeared in fifteen volumes between 1961 and 1999.

Mehmeti's verse is one of indigenous sensitivity. He relies on many of the figures, metaphors and symbols of northern Albanian popular verse to imbue and stabilize his restless lyrics with the stoic vision of the mountain tribes. Despite the light breeze of romanticism which wafts through his verse, as critic Rexhep Qosja once put it, this creative assimilation of folklore remains strongly fused with a realist current, at times ironic, which takes its roots in part from the ethics of revolt in the tradition of Migjeni and Esad Mekuli. Mehmeti's poetic restlessness is, nonetheless, not focused on messianic protest or social criticism but on artistic creativity and individual perfection.

Bibliography
Në krahët e shkrepave (1961)
Rini diellore (1966)
Dridhjet e dritës (1969)
Heshtja e kallur (1972)
Fanar në furtuna (1981)
Agu, dramë (1982)
Prapë fillimi (1996)
Klithmë është emri im (Tirana, 2002)
Mos vdis kur vdiset (2001)

Annotations

References 

Kosovan poets
1932 births
University of Belgrade Faculty of Philosophy alumni
2010 deaths
Writers from Gjakova
Kosovo Albanians
Albanian-language poets
20th-century poets